At the 2019 European Games in Minsk, sixteen medal events in canoe sprint were contested between 25 and 27 June 2019, of which five are Canadian canoe events and eleven are kayak events.

In contrast to 2015, this competition effectively replaced the 2019 Canoe Sprint European Championships (which the ECA chose not to organise).

Qualification

There were a total of 350 athlete quota places available for canoe sprint at the 2019 European Games; 175 each for men and women.

The sole qualification event was the 2018 Canoe Sprint European Championships in Belgrade between 8 and 10 June 2018.

Competition schedule

Medalists

Men

Women

Medal table

Participating nations
A total of 341 athletes from 37 nations competed in canoe sprint at the 2019 European Games:

References

 
Sports at the 2019 European Games
2019
European Games